New Electricity Trading Arrangements (NETA) is the system of market trading arrangements under which electricity is traded in the United Kingdom's wholesale electricity market as of 27 March 2001. The arrangements provided that parties could trade off their imbalances close to real time.

BETTA
As of April 2005, NETA changed its name to the British Electricity Trading Transmission Arrangements, and expanding to become the single Great Britain electricity market of England, Wales and Scotland.

See also
 Electricity billing in the UK
 National Grid (UK)
 Grid Trade Master Agreement

References

External links
neta - Electricity Summary Page (live NETA information), ELEXON Limited

Former nationalised industries of the United Kingdom
Electric power in the United Kingdom
Electricity supply industry